It Takes a Worried Man is a British TV sitcom. The first two series were broadcast on the ITV network, and the third and final series on Channel 4. Most episodes were written by the star, Peter Tilbury, who played office worker Philip Roath. The title comes from a line in the folk song Worried Man Blues. The series was based on the writings about the male menopause by novellist Philip Roth, for which Tilbury also named the main character after. He also took inspiration from his own life towards the character of Roath.

Premise 
Philip Roath is a middle-aged and divorced office worker who is highly intelligent, but suffering a midlife crisis, and completely bored 
with his job. He is never seen doing any actual work, just conversing 
with his colleagues about his boredom and frustrations with life. 
His boss suspects that Philip does little work, but is powerless to prove it or to do anything about it. 
Philip is also seen in psychoanalysis sessions with his analyst, Simon, who has worse emotional issues than Philip does.

Cast list 
 Peter Tilbury – Philip Roath
 Sue Holderness – Liz (Series 2-3) 
 Diana Payan – Ruth
 Andrew Tourell – Napley
 Nicholas Le Prevost – Simon
 Christopher Benjamin – The Old Man (Philip's Boss)
 Angela Down – Lillian (Series 1)

Episodes

Series 1 (1981)

Series 2 (1983)

Series 3 (1983)

DVD Release
All three series of It Takes a Worried Man have been released individually on DVD by Network. As of 2023, a complete boxset has yet to be released.

External links

References 

1980s British sitcoms
1981 British television series debuts
1983 British television series endings
ITV sitcoms
Channel 4 sitcoms
Midlife crisis in television
Television shows produced by Thames Television
Television series by Fremantle (company)
English-language television shows